The German residence permit (German: Aufenthaltstitel) is a document issued to non-EU citizens (so-called third-country nationals) living in Germany.

Prior to 1 September 2011, residence permits and additional provisions were affixed to pages inside the passport (in sticker form). Today, residence permits are issued as ID-1 (credit card size) plastic cards and the additional provisions are printed on a separate sheet of paper, so that residents have to possess (but not carry around) up to three different documents: a passport from their country of citizenship, their residence permit, and the supplementary sheet (if applicable). Carrying passports and residence cards is only compulsory when crossing borders. Within Germany, it is sufficient to know where they are and to show them to the police within a reasonable amount of time, when requested.

Legal aspects

Types of residence permits

Limited residence permit
A limited residence permit (a so-called Aufenthaltserlaubnis, literally residence permit) is valid for a certain period of time and is issued for a certain purpose:
residence for educational purposes
residence for the purpose of economic activity
residence under international law or on humanitarian or political grounds
residence for family reasons
The Aufenthaltserlaubnis does not automatically grant the right to work; instead the permission to work must be explicitly mentioned in the document.

Unlimited residence permit
An unlimited residence permit (a so-called Niederlassungserlaubnis, literally settlement permit) is a permanent residence permit. It grants the right to live and work in Germany under EU law. A foreigner receives a settlement permit if:
he or she has held a residence permit for five years
his or her livelihood is secure
he or she is permitted to work
he or she possesses sufficient living space for himself or herself and the members of his or her family forming part of his or her household

Additional provisions
Additional provisions (e.g. whether the resident is allowed to work) are stored on the chip and are printed on a supplementary sheet which must be kept together with the residence permit.

Physical appearance

Since 1 September 2011, the residence permit is issued as ID-1 (credit card size) plastic cards with an embedded RFID chip. It is covered with multi-colour guillochés and appears pink-blue from the distance. All information on it is given only in German (except for the English words residence permit).

Front side

The front side shows the symbol for biometric travel documents, the German Eagle, the European bull, and the words "AUFENTHALTSTITEL" and "RESIDENCE PERMIT". It contains the following information:

Photo of ID card holder (biometric photo)
Document number (9 alphanumeric digits)
Access number for RFID chip (6 decimal digits)
Surname
Given name(s)
Validity of residence permit: date of expire or "UNBEFRISTET" (unlimited)
Place of issue
First day of validity (dd-mm-yyyy)
type of document ("AUFENTHALTSERLAUBNIS" or "NIEDERLASSUNGSERLAUBNIS")
Notes:
Document number of corresponding passport
Date of expire of corresponding passport (dd-mm-yyyy)
If holder is permitted to work: "ERWERBSTÄTIGKEIT GESTATTET" (employment permitted)
If additional provisions exist: "SIEHE ZUSATZBLATT" (see supplementary sheet)
Signature of holder

Back side
The back side contains the following information:

Place of birth
Date of birth (dd-mm-yyyy)
Nationality (three-letter code)
Sex (M or F)
Height in cm
Colour of eyes
Residence (postal code, town, street, house number)
Issuing authority
Machine-readable zone

Machine-readable zone

The three-line machine-readable zone on the back side contains the following information:

First line

Second line

Third line

Empty spaces are represented by "<".

Chip

The residence permit contains a RFID chip. The chip stores the information given on the document (like name or date of birth), the holder's picture and, if the holder is at least six years old, also his/her fingerprints. The additional provisions are also stored on the chip. In addition, the new ID card can be used for online authentification (e.g. for age verification or for e-government applications). An electronic signature, provided by a private company, can also be stored on the chip.

The document number, the photo and the fingerprints can be read only by law enforcement agencies and some other authorities.

To use the online authentification function, the holder needs a six-digit decimal PIN. If the holder types in the wrong PIN, he has to type in the six-digit decimal access code given on the document to prove he/she really possesses the document. If the wrong PIN is used three times, a PUK must be used to unlock the chip.
The data on the chip are protected by Basic Access Control and Extended Access Control.

Security features

The residence permit contains the following security features:
multicoloured guillochés
microprinting: EU and DEUTSCHLAND
fluorescent elements:
UV overprint: stars, lines, and EU luminesce in various colors under UV light
randomly distributed fluorescent fibres which luminesce under UV light
tactile features:
access number for RFID chip is tactile
surface embossing: map of Germany and microlettering
security thread: colour changes when viewed under different angles; is personalized: NNNNNNNNNN<<SURNAME<<GIVEN<NAMES<<<<<<<<<< (NNNNNNNNNN is the document number including a check digit; a total of 42 digits can be found on the thread))
changeable laser image: shows either the date of expire or the holder's portrait depending on angle
color-changing ink: the colour of the biometric travel documents symbol changes from green to gold to red
2D and 3D holographic security elements:
colour-changing holograms colour changes depending on angle (violet-blue-turquoise-green-yellow-orange-red)
holographic portrait: holographic reproduction of the holder's picture
four eagles at the left side of the holographic portrait: change their colour under a different angle than the portrait itself
document number: NNNNNNNNN, 9 digits
holder's name: SURNAME<<GIVEN<NAMES<<<<<<<<<<, 30 digits
green kinematic structures above the conventional picture:
EU Kinegram: bright E on dark background changes to dark E on bright background when document is tilted
hexagon: moves across the picture when document is tilted
stars: change their size when document is tilted
text on the left side of the picture; visible only under a certain angle
macrolettering: BUNDESREPUBLIK DEUTSCHLAND
microlettering: BUNDESREPUBLIK DEUTSCHLAND BUNDESREPUBLIK DEUTSCHLAND BUNDESREPUBLIK DEUTSCHLAND
machine-verifiable structure: a red spot which can be checked by machines
3D eagle: a red-gold eagle visible only under a certain angle

See also
German passport
German identity card
Visa policy in the European Union
Permanent residency

External links
General information about the new ID-1 residence permit on the homepage of the Federal Office for Migration and Refugees
General information about the new ID-1 residence permit on bundesdruckerei.de
Security features of the new ID-1 card residence permit on bundesdruckerei.de
Old ID-2 sticker Aufenthaltserlaubnis on PRADO
Old ID-2 sticker ''Niederlassungserlaubnis on PRADO
German Residence Act
REGULATION (EC) No 1030/2002 of 13 June 2002 laying down a uniform format for residence permits for third-country nationals
REGULATION (EC) No 380/2008 of 18 April 2008 amending Regulation (EC) No 1030/2002 laying down a uniform format for residence permits for third-country nationals

Immigration to Germany
Privacy in Germany
Immigration documents
Residence permit